Ayot Green is a hamlet in Hertfordshire, England and is near the A1(M) Motorway, close to Welwyn Garden City. It is a typical traditional English village, centred on a village green. There are several other Ayots in the area, including Ayot St Lawrence and Ayot St Peter (where in 2011 The Census was included), and it also gives name to the rail trail called Ayot Greenway which stretches from Ayot Green to Wheathampstead.

References

External links

Hamlets in Hertfordshire
Welwyn Hatfield